Humoral immunity is the aspect of immunity that is mediated by macromolecules - including secreted antibodies, complement proteins, and certain antimicrobial peptides - located in extracellular fluids. Humoral immunity is named so because it involves substances found in the humors, or body fluids. It contrasts with cell-mediated immunity. Humoral immunity is also referred to as antibody-mediated immunity.

The study of the molecular and cellular components that form the immune system, including their function and interaction, is the central science of immunology. The immune system is divided into a more primitive innate immune system and an acquired or adaptive immune system of vertebrates, each of which contain both humoral and cellular immune elements.

Humoral immunity refers to antibody production and the coinciding processes that accompany it, including: Th2 activation and cytokine production, germinal center formation and isotype switching, and affinity maturation and memory cell generation. It also refers to the effector functions of antibodies, which include pathogen and toxin neutralization, classical complement activation, and opsonin promotion of phagocytosis and pathogen elimination.

History
The concept of humoral immunity developed based on the analysis of antibacterial activity of the serum components. Hans Buchner is credited with the development of the humoral theory. In 1890, Buchner described alexins as "protective substances" that exist in the blood serum and other bodily fluids and are capable of killing microorganisms. Alexins, later redefined as "complements" by Paul Ehrlich, were shown to be the soluble components of the innate response that leads to a combination of cellular and humoral immunity. This discovery helped to bridge the features of innate and acquired immunity.

Following the 1888 discovery of the bacteria that cause diphtheria and tetanus, Emil von Behring and Kitasato Shibasaburō showed that disease need not be caused by microorganisms themselves. They discovered that cell-free filtrates were sufficient to cause disease. In 1890, filtrates of diphtheria, later named diphtheria toxins, were used to vaccinate animals in an attempt to demonstrate that immunized serum contained an antitoxin that could neutralize the activity of the toxin and could transfer immunity to non-immune animals. In 1897, Paul Ehrlich showed that antibodies form against the plant toxins ricin and abrin, and proposed that these antibodies are responsible for immunity. Ehrlich, with his colleague von Behring, went on to develop the diphtheria antitoxin, which became the first major success of modern immunotherapy. The discovery of specified compatible antibodies became a major tool in the standardization of immunity and the identification of lingering infections.

Antibodies 

Immunoglobulins are glycoproteins in the immunoglobulin superfamily that function as antibodies. The terms antibody and immunoglobulin are often used interchangeably. They are found in the blood and tissue fluids, as well as many secretions. In structure, they are large Y-shaped globular proteins. In mammals there are five types of antibody: IgA, IgD, IgE, IgG, and IgM. Each immunoglobulin class differs in its biological properties and has evolved to deal with different antigens. Antibodies are synthesized and secreted by plasma cells that are derived from the B cells of the immune system.

An antibody is used by the acquired immune system to identify and neutralize foreign objects like bacteria and viruses. Each antibody recognizes a specific antigen unique to its target. By binding their specific antigens, antibodies can cause agglutination and precipitation of antibody-antigen products, prime for phagocytosis by macrophages and other cells, block viral receptors, and stimulate other immune responses, such as the complement pathway.

An incompatible blood transfusion causes a transfusion reaction, which is mediated by the humoral immune response. This type of reaction, called an acute hemolytic reaction, results in the rapid destruction (hemolysis) of the donor red blood cells by host antibodies. The cause is usually a clerical error, such as the wrong unit of blood being given to the wrong patient. The symptoms are fever and chills, sometimes with back pain and pink or red urine (hemoglobinuria). The major complication is that hemoglobin released by the destruction of red blood cells can cause acute kidney failure.

Antibody production 
In humoral immune response, the B cells first mature in the bone marrow and gain B-cell receptors (BCR's) which are displayed in large numbers on the cell surface.

These membrane-bound protein complexes have antibodies which are specific for antigen detection. Each B cell has a unique antibody that binds with an antigen. The mature B cells then migrate from the bone marrow to the lymph nodes or other lymphatic organs, where they begin to encounter pathogens.

B cell activation 
When a B cell encounters an antigen a signal is activated, the antigen binds to the receptor and is taken inside the B cell by endocytosis. The antigen is processed and presented on the B cell's surface again by MHC-II proteins. The MHC-II proteins are recognized by helper T cells, stimulating the production of proteins, allowing for B cells to multiply and the descendants to differentiate into antibody-secreting cells circulating in the blood. B cells can be activated through certain microbial agents without the help of T-cells and have the ability to work directly with antigens to provide responses to pathogens present.

B cell proliferation 
The B cell waits for a helper T cell (TH) to bind to the complex. This binding will activate the TH cell, which then releases cytokines that induce B cells to divide rapidly, making thousands of identical clones of the B cell. These daughter cells either become plasma cells or memory cells. The memory B cells remain inactive here; later, when these memory B cells encounter the same antigen due to reinfection, they divide and form plasma cells. On the other hand, the plasma cells produce a large number of antibodies which are released freely into the circulatory system.

Antibody-antigen reaction 
These antibodies will encounter antigens and bind with them. This will either interfere with the chemical interaction between host and foreign cells, or they may form bridges between their antigenic sites hindering their proper functioning. Their presence might also attract macrophages or killer cells to attack and phagocytose them.

Complement system

The complement system is a biochemical cascade of the innate immune system that helps clear pathogens from an organism. It is derived from many small blood plasma proteins that work together to disrupt the target cell's plasma membrane leading to cytolysis of the cell. The complement system consists of more than 35 soluble and cell-bound proteins, 12 of which are directly involved in the complement pathways. The complement system is involved in the activities of both innate immunity and acquired immunity.

Activation of this system leads to cytolysis, chemotaxis, opsonization, immune clearance, and inflammation, as well as the marking of pathogens for phagocytosis. The proteins account for 5% of the serum globulin fraction. Most of these proteins circulate as zymogens, which are inactive until proteolytic cleavage.

Three biochemical pathways activate the complement system: the classical complement pathway, the alternate complement pathway, and the mannose-binding lectin pathway. The classical complement pathway typically requires antibodies for activation and is a specific immune response, while the alternate pathway can be activated without the presence of antibodies and is considered a non-specific immune response. Antibodies, in particular the IgG1 class, can also "fix" complement. These processes differ only in the process of activating C3 convertase, which is the initial step of complement activation, and the subsequent process are eventually the same, forming a structure called the membrane attack complex (MAC) on the bacterial cell wall to destroy the bacteria.

See also
 Immune system
 Cell-mediated immunity (vs. humoral immunity)
 Immunity
 Polyclonal response

References

9. Janeway CA Jr, Travers P, Walport M, et al. Immunobiology: The Immune System in Health and Disease. 5th edition. New York: Garland Science; 2001. The complement system and innate immunity. Available from: https://www.ncbi.nlm.nih.gov/books/NBK27100/

Further reading
 The following article reviews some of the early experiments that laid the foundations of the humoral theory: 

Immunology